Neil Davis (born 15 August 1973) is a professional footballer, who plays for Midland Football Alliance side Coleshill Town, where he plays as a striker.

References

1973 births
Living people
People from Bloxwich
English footballers
Redditch United F.C. players
Aston Villa F.C. players
Tranmere Rovers F.C. players
Wycombe Wanderers F.C. players
Walsall F.C. players
Hednesford Town F.C. players
Newport County A.F.C. players
Bromsgrove Rovers F.C. players
Coleshill Town F.C. players
Premier League players
Association football forwards